Newton's law may refer to:
Newton's laws of motion
Newton's law of universal gravitation
Newton's law of cooling
Newton's Law (TV series)